, also called  (literally meaning "Saint-Étienne school of mines") or simply  and commonly abbreviated EMSE is a prestigious French graduate engineering school training engineers and carrying out industry-oriented research. Its function is to support the development of its students and of companies through a range of courses and fields of research, from the initial training of generalist engineers , to PhD teaching; from material sciences to micro-electronics via process engineering, mechanics, the environment, civil engineering, finance, computer science and health engineering.

History

The school was founded in 1816 by a decision of Louis XVIII  (2 August 1816).

Admission for French students

For French nationals, admission to Civil Engineer of Mines is decided after competitive examination at the end of preparatory classes, a highly selective system.

Notable alumni
 Benoît Fourneyron, designed the first practical water turbine in 1827
 Henri Fayol, a French management theorist
 Jules Garnier
 Mahamadou Issoufou, elected Niger President in March 2011
Anne-Marcelle Kahn, (née Schrameck) first woman to graduate from the school, in 1919.
 Tadeusz Nowicki

The puRkwa Prize 
The puRkwa Prize is an "international prize for the scientific literacy of the children of the planet" awarded annually by the école nationale supérieure des mines of Saint Etienne and the French Academy of Sciences. The prize is awarded to pioneers in the innovation of general science education in school curricula for children less than 16 years of age. It was launched in 2004 at the initiative of Robert Germinet, the director of the école nationale supérieure des mines of Saint Etienne, and comes with an €80,000 monetary award.

Other schools of Mines in France
 École nationale supérieure des Mines d'Albi Carmaux (Mines Albi-Carmaux)
 École nationale supérieure des Mines d'Alès (Mines Alès)
 École nationale supérieure des Mines de Douai (Mines Douai)
 École nationale supérieure des Mines de Nancy
 École nationale supérieure des Mines de Nantes (Mines Nantes)
 École nationale supérieure des Mines de Paris (Mines ParisTech)

Other schools of Mines in Africa
 École nationale supérieure des Mines de Rabat (Mines Rabat)

Other schools of Mines in the USA
 Colorado School of Mines

Notes

See also 

 Official website
 SPIN Center of Chemical Engineering
 Saint Etienne Mines alumni union
 Mines alumni union (all french Schools of Mines)

Schools of mines
Engineering universities and colleges in France
Technical universities and colleges in France
Saint-Étienne
Universities and colleges in Saint-Étienne
Educational institutions established in 1816
1816 establishments in France